Asian Archery Championships is the archery championship organized by the World Archery Asia.

It has been held biannually, and since 2001 has included both the recurve and compound disciplines.
The tournament began in 1980 and it was first hosted in India. Countries such as South Korea, China, Japan, and India compete, with many of the world's leading archers representing them.

List of tournaments and champions

Recurve

Compound

References

External links
 www.asianarchery.com
 World Archery Federation archive
 World Archery Federation results archive

 
International archery competitions
Archery
Recurring sporting events established in 1980